Lemoyne is an unincorporated community in northern Troy Township, Wood County, Ohio, United States.  It has a post office with the ZIP code 43441.  It lies along the concurrent U.S. Routes 20 and 23.

History
Lemoyne was platted in 1877 when the railroad was extended to that point. The community most likely bears the French surname of a pioneer settler. A post office called Le Moyne was established in 1877, and the name was changed to Lemoyne in 1893.

References

Unincorporated communities in Wood County, Ohio
Unincorporated communities in Ohio